In geometry, tangent circles (also known as kissing circles) are circles in a common plane that intersect in a single point.  There are two types of tangency: internal and external.  Many problems and constructions in geometry are related to tangent circles; such problems often have real-life applications such as trilateration and maximizing the use of materials.

Two given circles

Two circles are mutually and externally tangent if distance between their centers is equal to the sum of their radii

Steiner chains

Pappus chains

Three given circles: Apollonius' problem

Apollonius' problem is to construct circles that are tangent to three given circles.

Apollonian gasket

If a circle is iteratively inscribed into the interstitial curved triangles between three mutually tangent circles, an Apollonian gasket results, one of the earliest fractals described in print.

Malfatti's problem

Malfatti's problem is to carve three cylinders from a triangular block of marble, using as much of the marble as possible. In 1803, Gian Francesco Malfatti conjectured that the solution would be obtained by inscribing three mutually tangent circles into the triangle (a problem that had previously been considered by Japanese mathematician Ajima Naonobu); these circles are now known as the Malfatti circles, although the conjecture has been proven to be false.

Six circles theorem

A chain of six circles can be drawn such that each circle is tangent to two sides of a given triangle and also to the preceding circle in the chain. The chain closes; the sixth circle is always tangent to the first circle.

Generalizations

Problems involving tangent circles are often generalized to spheres.  For example, the Fermat problem of finding sphere(s) tangent to four given spheres is a generalization of Apollonius' problem, whereas Soddy's hexlet is a generalization of a Steiner chain.

See also 

 Tangent lines to circles
 Circle packing theorem, the result that every planar graph may be realized by a system of tangent circles
 Hexafoil, the shape formed by a ring of six tangent circles
 Feuerbach's theorem on the tangency of the nine-point circle of a triangle with its incircle and excircles
 Descartes' theorem
 Ford circle
 Bankoff circle
 Archimedes' twin circles
 Archimedean circle
 Schoch circles
 Woo circles
 Arbelos
 Ring lemma

References

External links
 

Circles